Sir Thomas Frankland, 2nd Baronet (September 1665 – 30 October 1726), of Thirkleby Hall in Yorkshire, was an English landowner and Whig politician who sat in the English and British House of Commons from 1685 to 1711. He was joint Postmaster General from 1691 to 1715.

Early life
Frankland was the eldest son of Sir William Frankland, 1st Baronet and his wife Arabella Belasyse, daughter of Hon. Henry Belasyse MP of Newburgh Priory, Yorkshire. He was at Cambridge University from 1680 to 1681 and was admitted at Lincoln's Inn in 1683. He married Elizabeth Russell, daughter of Sir John Russell and Frances Cromwell (daughter of Oliver Cromwell), by licence dated 14 February 1683.

Career
Frankland entered Parliament at the 1685 English general election as Member of Parliament for Thirsk as a substitute for his father who was known as an exclusionist. He played no part in parliament, but was returned again at the 1689 English general election. He was appointed a Commissioner for excise in April 1689, but lost the post in October when he was unable to subscribe to a government loan.

Frankland was returned again as a Whig MP for Thirsk at the 1690 English general election and in February 1691 was appointed joint Postmaster-General with Sir Robert Cotton, a Tory, the post having been split to be shared between a Whig and a Tory. He held the post until 1715 and proved an assiduous postmaster, making many improvements, particularly with regard to overseas mail. However his Parliamentary activity was slight.  He did not stand at the 1695 English general election, but was returned instead as MP for Hedon in a by-election on 7 December 1695. He signed the Association in February 1696 and voted with the Court for fixing the price of guineas at 22 shillings in March. He and Cotton were charged with improving laws related to the post office. He voted for the attainder of Sir John Fenwick on 25 November 1696. On the death of his father on 2 August 1697, he succeeded to the baronetcy. At the 1698 English general election he was returned again as MP for Thirsk. He presented a petition to the House of Commons on 23 February 1699, from the inhabitants and clothiers of Halifax, with regard to woollen manufacture.
 
Frankland was returned unopposed again for Thirsk at the two general elections of 1701 and at the 1702 English general election. He started to use his interest in Yorkshire and in the Post Office to influence the results at other constituencies. At the 1705 English general election, he was returned unopposed for Thirsk again. He voted for the Court candidate for Speaker on 25 October 1705, and supported the Court in the proceedings on the 'place clause' of the regency bill on 18 February 1706. He was returned again for Thirsk at the 1708 British general election and supported the naturalization of the Palatines. He became involved in the attempt of Dumfries Burgh to have their postal service to Carlisle established by Act of Parliament. The issue became wrapped up in the general attempts to improve the Union and other procedural matters and was lost in that parliament. Meanwhile, Frankland voted for the impeachment of Dr Sacheverell. He was returned again for Thirsk at the 1710 British general election and on 18 February 1711 he was appointed to the committee to draft a bill to establish a General Post Office for Great Britain and the dominions. At about this time he discovered that a clause in the first Lottery Act made his post as joint postmaster incompatible with a seat in Parliament. After voting against an amendment to the South Sea bill on 25 May 1711, he vacated his seat in Parliament.

Frankland kept his place as joint postmaster-general until 1715 after the accession of George I, and was appointed as a Commissioner for customs until 1718 when he was too infirm to carry on. He was then given a pension of £500 a year.  He retired from public life. In 1722 he rebuilt the church at Thirkleby at his own expense.

Death and legacy
Frankland died on 30 October 1726, in his 62nd year, and was buried at Thirkleby. He left his lands to his eldest son Thomas, and more than £13,000 divided between his other legatees, including his surviving family, servants and tenants He and his wife had nine children:
 Thomas Frankland  (c. 1685–1747), who succeeded his father in the baronetcy and was also MP for Thirsk and for Harwich
 William Frankland  (died 1714), Treasurer of the Stamp Office
 John, died young in Hamburg
 Henry Frankland, Governor of Bengal (died 1728), father of Sir Charles Frankland, 4th Baronet, and Sir Thomas Frankland, 5th Baronet
 Richard Frankland  (died 1761), Commissioner of the Salt Office
 Frederick Meinhardt Frankland (c. 1694–1768), barrister-at-law, MP for Thirsk
 Robert Frankland, murdered in India
 Mary (died 1722), who married Thomas Worsley of Hovingham Hall 
 Frances, who married Roger Talbot
Two of his sons sat for Thirsk between 1713 and 1749

Thirkleby Hall was rebuilt in 1790, and Thirkleby Church was replaced in 1851.

References

|-

1665 births
1726 deaths
Frankland, Thomas, 2nd Baronet
English MPs 1685–1687
English MPs 1689–1690
English MPs 1690–1695
English MPs 1695–1698
English MPs 1698–1700
English MPs 1701
English MPs 1701–1702
English MPs 1702–1705
English MPs 1705–1707
Members of the Parliament of Great Britain for English constituencies
British MPs 1707–1708
British MPs 1708–1710
British MPs 1710–1713
United Kingdom Postmasters General
Members of the Parliament of England for Hedon
Thomas